Regional Information Center for Science and Technology (RICeST) is an Iranian governmental organisation established to promote the production and distribution of scientific information in Iran and Islamic countries, providing reference, study and bibliographical information and related services. It also undertakes scientometrics based on its databases of scientific products of Iran and Islamic countries.

It was established as Regional Library of Science and Technology (RLST) in 1991 by agreement between Iran's Ministry of Culture and Higher Education and the Third-World Academy of Sciences, with professor Jafar Mehrad as the director. It is currently under the Ministry of Science, Research and Technology.   It is also known as the Shiraz Regional Library of Sciences and Technology (SRLST)
Before the Internet was established in Iran, RICeST fulfilled its objectives by setting up a Bulletin Board Service to allow electronic access to the information sources it was collating.

Finances
In 1993, it was approved for an independent budget of 1800 million Rials.  Around the same time it obtained a loan from the Islamic Development Bank for $15 million.

, the Ministry of Science, Research and Technology provides RICeST annually with about one million dollars to purchase scientific journals.  RICeST allocated about one million and 600 thousand dollars each year to purchase journals in languages other than Persian.

Regional Information Center for Science & Technology 
 Presidency
President Office 
Office of International Scientific Cooperation 
Plan and Program department 
 Deputy Finance and Administration 
Financial Administrative Affairs 
Administrative affairs 
Financial Department 

 Research Deputy 
Research Deputy 
Designing and System Operation Research Group 
Research Department of Information Management 
Research Department of Evaluation and Collection Development 
Research Department of Computational Linguistics 
Information and Communication Technology Department 
Office of Information Services

Branches
National Branches
 Urmia University
 Shahr-e-Kord University

 Hormozgan University
 Isfahan Municipality
 Hamedan University
 Sahand University of Technology
 Yasouj University
 Zanjan University
 Kermanshah Razi University
 Gilan University
 Qazvin Islamic Development Organization
 University of Sistan and Baluchestan
Forient Branches
 Teeshrin University  (Syria)
 National Information Center (Yemen)

Databases
RICeST has created, maintained and provided access to many subject matter bibliographic databases and directories.  In 2006 RICeST started collected journals in art, humanities and social sciences

Persian General Databases
 Integrated Database
 E-Articles 
 E-Journals 
 E-Books 
 E-Atlases & Maps 
 Research Reports 
 Conference Articles
 Abstrans  
 Iranian Universities Libraries 
 EDMS
 Databank for Higher Education Graduates in LIS
 Library Catalogue
 Database of Standard Questionnaires and Tests of Educational Science and Psychology Dissertation of Iran 
Persian Subject Databases
 IR.Compendex 
 Iran Lisa 
 Iranian Experts 
 Transportation 
 Earthquake 
 Energy 
 Flood 
 IR. Industries 
 IR. Metallurgical Industries 
 Environment 
 Mines of IRAN 
 Standards
Non Persian Databases
 Islamic E-Manuscripts 
 Content Search 
 Scientific Articles 
 E-Theses & Dissertations

IRAN Journals
 Persian E-Articles
 Arabic E-Articles
 English E-Articles
 Persian Journal Search
 Persian E-Journals
 Arabic E-Journals
 English E-Journals
 Accredited Journals
 International Journal of Information Science and Management (IJISM)

Library Automation Software
A team of IT and librarianship experts contributed to developing the library automation software with the following specifications:
 Thesaurus based
 Supports barcode & RFID
 Workflow automation
 Import data from other databases
 Reduced Redundancy
 Fast search ability
 Relational Database
 Low cost database Design
 Non Redundant subjective DBS
 Journals automation system
 Source availability
 Web based App
 Unicode support
 Normalized relation database
 Full text search engine
 Uses 3 layered Approach

Research Project
 A feasibility of doing interlanguage information retrieval by Google machine translation 
 System of information transmission from Persian journals XML file to RICeST system 
 Feasibility of using concept-based readability in Persian domain specific information retrieval 
 Machine stemmer of past, present and future simple verbs 
 Examining and assessing methods and processes of publishing journals 
 The Challenges of Persian Natural Language Processing 
 Design and implementation of a new structure of ISC database 
 Designing ISC content list in Persian/ ISCI citation reports + h-index /rewriting Persian highly cited proceedings database 
 Citation analysis of Persian humanities journals in ISC database within 2003-2007 
 Database of standard questionnaires and tests of educational sciences theses within 2005- 2007 
 Evaluating websites of the universities and research centers affiliated to the Ministry of Science, Research and Technology & the Ministry of Health, Treatment and Medical Education and Islamic Azad Universities 
 Database of Content Search 
 Full text formatting of the database of ISI citation index 
 Persian past and present stemmer of intransitive verbs of Persian language 
 Top 20 countries’ scientific production status 
 Database of computer sciences and engineering abstracts 
 Iran LISA database 
 Structuring derivational word in Persian language 
 A comprehensive database of undergraduate students of library and information sciences of Iran from the beginning up to 2004 
 Database of scientific and research publication of faculty members of the Ministry of Science, Research and Technology, I. R. of Iran 
 Design and implementation of manuscripts in electronics format at RLST on the internet 
 Database of Maps and Atlases (Design and implementation on the Web) 
 Iran's and Islamic countries Science Citation Index(SCI) 
 Database of Iran's Supreme court votes 
 System for documents electronic management 
 Design & Implementation of Persian E-Journals on the Internet 
 Database of Iranian Metallurgical Industries with Related Standards: Design and Implementation on the Web 
 Assessment of the Use of Artificial Neural Network for information Retrieval in RLST's Databases 
 Design & Implementation of a Web-Based Persian E-Books 
 Design & Implementation of a Web-Based Persian E-Articles

References

External links
 
 RICeST, Libdex

1991 establishments in Iran
Government agencies of Iran
Buildings and structures in Shiraz
Education in Fars Province